Pinkwashing is the strategy of promoting LGBT rights protections as evidence of liberalism and democracy, especially to distract from or legitimize violence against other countries or communities, often to improve a country's tarnished reputation. The concept has been used by Sarah Schulman in 2011 with reference to Israeli government public relations, and is related to homonationalism, the exploitation of sexual minorities to justify racism and xenophobia. Pinkwashing is a continuation of the civilizing mission used to justify colonialism, this time on the basis of LGBT rights in Western countries. More broadly, pinkwashing can also be defined as "the deployment of superficially sympathetic messages for [ends] having little or nothing to do with lesbian, gay, bisexual, transgender, and queer (LGBTQ) equality or inclusion", including LGBT marketing.

Origin of the term
In April 2010, Queers Undermining Israeli Terrorism (QUIT) in the Bay Area, used the phrase pinkwashing as a twist on greenwashing, a practice where companies claim to be eco-friendly in order to make profit. Dunya Alwan was at a talk with Ali Abunimah, editor of Electronic Intifada in 2010, when he said "We won't put up with Israel whitewashing or greenwashing" and she thought "or pinkwashing!"

In 2011, Sarah Schulman used the term pinkwashing in a widely read The New York Times editorial arguing that Israel used the tactic in its public relations. Schulman saw pinkwashing as a manifestation of homonationalism, the processes by which some powers selectively agree with the claims of sexual minorities and exploit them to justify racism, xenophobia (rejection of foreign people), and aporophobia (rejection of the poor); in short, the intersection between gay identities and nationalist ideology. Homonationalism shaped the concept of pinkwashing and the two terms are often used together as tools to explain the actions of countries. Jasbir Puar writes in a later article, Rethinking Homonationalism, that the two terms are not parallel but rather pinkwashing is able to exist because homonationalism exists.

By country

Israeli government public relations
The Israeli government's marketing strategy includes "Israel Beyond the Conflict", an attempt to promote aspects of Israeli life outside the Israeli–Palestinian conflict. According to Israeli gay rights activist Hagai El-Ad, "In no other arena has that been used in a more cynical way than in the context of LGBT rights." According to Palestinian anthropologist Sa'ed Atshan,

After the 2011 Gaza Freedom Flotilla, an Israeli actor created a hoax video in which he pretended to have been turned away from the flotilla because he was gay. The video was promoted by the Israeli prime minister's office. In 2014, a teenage Palestinian Mohammed Abu Khdeir was murdered by Israeli settlers in the West Bank. After his death, Israeli police said they were investigating the incident as an honor killing on the grounds that Abu Khdeir was allegedly gay. Lara Friedman called this honor-killing story to be a "blood libel against all Palestinians".

Joseph Massad, associate professor of modern Arab politics and intellectual history at Columbia University, has written that the Israeli government "insist[s] on advertising and exaggerating its recent record on LGBT rights ... to fend off international condemnation of its violations of the rights of the Palestinian people". Culture studies academic Nada Elia calls pinkwashing "the twenty-first century manifestation of the Zionist colonialist narrative of bringing civilisation to an otherwise backwards land".

Opponents of the term pinkwashing in relation to Israel argue that Israeli society has seen meaningful progress on LGBT rights that are better than those in neighbouring countries. Others highlight the phenomenon of some gay Palestinians who live illegally in Israel; however, Israel has a rule against granting asylum to such individuals on the basis that "there is no systematic persecution based on sexual orientation in the Palestinian Authority". Pro-Israel writers also argue that the term is not always applied to other countries that use similar strategies. Ido Aharoni, former head of the Brand Israel project, responded to such criticism, saying: "We are not trying to hide the conflict, but broaden the conversation." Yair Qedar, a gay Israeli filmmaker and civil rights activist, has said that Israel has a praiseworthy LGBT+ rights record, and that failing to defend it "ultimately serves homophobia far more than dialogue and peace". He criticized Israeli LGBT+ groups for failing to oppose pinkwashing charges. Shaul Ganon of the Israeli-based LGBT+ rights group Aguda, assessed the dispute this way: "Each side is trying to gain some points. The truth is the only one who gets screwed by this is the Palestinian gays." According to Atshan, "the critiques leveled against [anti-pinkwashing activists] are often not well founded or ethically deployed. It is particularly disconcerting when supporters of Israel instead cast Israeli state sources of victimization as saviors of queer Palestinians." He also argues that anti-pinkwashing can go too far when activists prioritize the struggle against Israeli occupation and only bring up LGBT issues in order to criticize Israel.

Populist and far-right parties 
Marine Le Pen, president of the French far-right political party National Front, was gaining support from LGBT communities in the presidential election, despite the fact that Jean-Marie Le Pen, her father and the founder of the party, once condemned homosexuality as "a biological and social anomaly". After the Orlando nightclub shooting, Marine Le Pen declared "how much homosexuality is attacked in countries that live under the Islamist jackboot". Facing these threats and receiving "sympathy" from Le Pen, some LGBT voters started to advocate for the far-right party, with one supporter stating that "they'll be the first victims of these barbarians, and only Marine is proposing radical solutions".

The Flemish nationalist party Vlaams Belang and Filip Dewinter shifted their stance on gay issues in the 2010s and began using pro-gay rhetoric to criticize Muslims and immigrants. According to Eric Louis Russell, Dewinter exploits homophobic violence in a similar way that pornography commodifies women's bodies; he argues "that this type of commodification of potential or real violence directed toward members of a society for political ends is a real, albeit subjacent and deeply insidious form of homophobia".

A coalition organized by several popular grassroots movements in Europe, including the English Defence League (EDL), mounted counter-jihad demonstrations in conjunction with LGBT Pride Week celebrations in Helsinki and Stockholm in July and August 2012. However, these movements inspired a counter demonstration by an LGBT rights group called "Queers against Pinkwashing", which claimed that the counter-jihad march against Muslims was a clear example of pinkwashing and projected a fake support image for sexual minorities. In an interview for Radio Sweden, Lisa Bjurwald, a Swedish journalist and expert on European right-wing ideology, criticized the EDL for allying with the wrong people, as "Queers against Pinkwashing" are in fact against singling out Islam as if it were the source of all the relevant problems because such attempts do not benefit the LGBTQ community.

Immigration
According to Professor of Gender and Women's Studies Eithne Luibhéid, Ireland used its 2015 same-sex marriage referendum "to pinkwash its migration regimes, thereby naturalizing harsh policies that reproduce gendered, sexual, racial, economic, and geopolitical inequalities".

In 2012, Jason Kenney, Canada's Minister of Citizenship and Immigration, was accused of pinkwashing, after an email titled "LGBT Refugees from Iran" was sent to thousands of Canadians. The message contained additional recent comments by John Baird, Minister of Foreign Affairs, about Canada's stand against the persecution and marginalization of gays and lesbian women around the world. A group of activists claimed that it "is a poor attempt at 'pinkwashing' the Conservative government's obvious desire to encourage war with Iran".

Corporate marketing 

Pinkwashing in the United States, according to author Stephan Dahl from the University of Hull, is centered around pride merchandise created and sold by companies that do nothing for queer people. This feeds a "big business small community" relationship and seems beneficial when in reality there is nothing changing legally for queer people through this practice.

A campaign to develop public support for the Keystone Pipeline, which would transport Canadian oil through the United States, has been accused of pinkwashing for its argument that the project deserves support based on a comparison of Canada's record on LGBT rights compared to that of other oil-producing nations. 

In Australia, concern has been raised about the commodification of gay rights by major corporations.

Intersex movement 

In June 2016, Organisation Intersex International Australia pointed to contradictory statements by Australian governments, suggesting that the dignity and rights of LGBT and intersex people are recognized while, at the same time, harmful practices on intersex children continue.

In August 2016, Zwischengeschlecht described actions to promote equality or civil status legislation without action on banning "intersex genital mutilations" as a form of pinkwashing. The organization has previously highlighted evasive government statements to UN Treaty Bodies that conflate intersex, transgender and LGBT issues, instead of addressing harmful practices on infants.

Anti-pinkwashing
Anti-pinkwashing or pinkwatching is the opposition to pinkwashing. Lynn Darwich and Hannen Maikay, in their article "The Road from Antipinkwashing Activism to the Decolonization of Palestine", allege that accusations of pinkwashing against Israel have led to an intersection of queer rights movements and Palestinian rights movements in Palestine and other countries, despite ongoing discrimination and abuse of LGBT individuals within Palestinian controlled territories. This is a strategy that has allowed the two activist groups to fight for one cause; however, it also places limits on both movements. Darwich and Maikay suggest that the anti-pinkwashing movement has to consider not only pinkwashing but also homonationalism, colonialism, and imperialism. The Palestinian queer movement rejects pinkwashing.

According to Cyril Ghosh, the argument against pinkwashing portraying Western countries as bastions of LGBT freedom while demonizing countries that lack LGBT rights protection has merit, but can fall into "Radical Theory Creep" when multiple strands of critique are combined in a way that lacks analytic rigor.

Notes

References

Sources

Further reading

LGBT and society
LGBT terminology